Belgrade  is the capital and largest city of Serbia.

Belgrade, Belgrad or Beograd may also refer to:

Places

Belgium 
 Belgrade, Namur, one of the old communes now included in the City of Namur, Belgium

Croatia 
 Belgrad, a village in Croatia, currently part of Grižane-Belgrad

United States 
 Belgrade, Maine
 Belgrade, Minnesota
 Belgrade, Missouri
 Belgrade, Montana
 Belgrade, Nebraska
 Belgrade, Texas
 Belgrade Township (disambiguation)

South Africa 
 Belgrade, KwaZulu-Natal

Other 
 Belgrad Forest, outside Istanbul, Turkey.
 Belgrade (film), a 2013 documentary about Belgrade, Serbia
 1517 Beograd, an asteroid, discovered by Milorad B. Protić
 Beograd (band), a pop band
 Belgrade Theatre, in Coventry, United Kingdom
 Belgrade and St. David's Church, Creswell, North Carolina

People with the name
Doug Belgrad, American film and TV producer
Robert Belgrade, American musician and voice actor

See also 
 Belgorod
 White City (disambiguation)